The Revolutionary Communist Party of Britain (Marxist–Leninist) (RCPB-ML) is a small British communist political party, previously named the Communist Party of England (Marxist-Leninist) (CPE (ML)) on formation in 1972 until being reorganised in 1979 after rejecting Maoism and aligning with Albania.  The party's thinking is based on the politics of Hardial Bains, who travelled the world founding orthodox (anti-revisionist) communist parties.

History

Origins (1967–1979)

The Revolutionary Communist Party of Britain (Marxist–Leninist) has its origins in the Sussex University-based English student movement, part of the Hardial Bains-inspired tendency, known as the Internationalists; and it formed following their Necessity For Change conference in 1967.  Renamed the English Communist Movement (Marxist-Leninist) in 1970, the group founded the Communist Party of England (Marxist-Leninist) (CPE (ML)) in March 1972.

Like other Bains-inspired parties, the CPE (ML) took the Chinese side in the Sino-Soviet split, thus being endorsed by Albania, allied at the time with Maoist China, and opposing both the capitalist West and the Soviet bloc in accordance with the Three Worlds Theory promoted by Beijing.  However, during the deterioration in Sino-Albanian relations, the CPE (ML) increasingly sided with Enver Hoxha, developed party-to-party relations with the Party of Labour of Albania, and renounced China as revisionist.

The CPE (ML) made headlines during its first two years.  In May 1973, members of affiliated group, the Birmingham Student Movement, instigated a widely reported physical attack on Hans Eysenck at the London School of Economics (LSE), though Eysenck declined to press charges.  In January 1974, four members of the party were found guilty of possession of petrol bombs and assaulting police.  At least one member had received a five-year sentence for malicious wounding and assault the previous year.

In 1973, the party put forward two candidates in parliamentary by-elections, and in 1974, stood for six seats in the February general election, and eight in the October general election.  Their highest recorded vote was 612 (1.2%) in Portsmouth South during the second 1974 general election.

In 1974, the Communist Party of England (Marxist-Leninist) lost around a tenth of its membership following the expulsion of Aravindan Balakrishnan and an associated group accused of "conspiratorial and splittist activities and social fascist slanders against the Party and the proletarian movement".  The group became the Workers' Institute of Marxism–Leninism–Mao Zedong Thought.

The party had links with the progressive music milieu in the 1970s, with avant-garde composers such as Cornelius Cardew and Michael Chant being leading members.

RCPB-ML (1979–present)
The Communist Party of England (Marxist-Leninist) was renamed the Revolutionary Communist Party of Britain (Marxist–Leninist) in 1979.  It is closely related to the Communist Party of Canada (Marxist-Leninist), and has good relations with the New Communist Party of Britain (founded 1977).  It produces an internet newspaper called Workers' Daily Internet Edition (WDIE), and has a bookshop in south London named John Buckle Books (named after the RCPB-ML founding general secretary).  It has been active in promoting solidarity with North Korea. In 2004, the party declared electoral support for the Respect Coalition, but it now calls for an end to the system that brings parties to power, and calls on workers' and peoples' collectives to intervene directly in the political process.  The party has a system of collective leadership, and its General Secretary is Michael Chant.  The party's logo is a black hammer and sickle within a yellow star on a red background.

Cornelius Cardew died in 1981, John Buckle in 1983, and Hardial Bains in 1997.

RCPB-ML official Roger Nettleship has stood for House of Commons seats such as Jarrow in 2005 and South Shields in 2001 and 2010.

The party supported Brexit in the 2016 referendum.

CPE (ML) election results

By-elections, 1970–1974

February 1974 UK general election

October 1974 UK general election

Source.

By-elections, 1974–1979

Rowe stood as East London Peoples Front, and Munro stood as South London Peoples Front.

See also

List of communist parties
List of political parties in the United Kingdom
Sino-Soviet split

References

External links
The Revolutionary Communist Party of Britain (Marxist-Leninist) — official website

1979 establishments in the United Kingdom
Political parties established in 1979
Far-left political parties
Anti-revisionist organizations
Communist parties in the United Kingdom
Maoist organisations in the United Kingdom
Hoxhaist parties
Anti-austerity political parties in the United Kingdom